Polohy is a city in Zaporizhzhia Oblast, Ukraine, currently under the control of the Russian Armed Forces. It serves as the administrative center of Polohy Raion. Population: .

From 1928 to 1937, it carried the name of Chubarivka, after the Ukrainian Bolshevik revolutionary and Soviet politician Vlas Chubar.

History 
On 3 March 2022, Polohy was captured by Russian forces during the Russian invasion of Ukraine.

Notable people
 Viktor Poltavets (1925–2003), Soviet and Ukrainian artist
 Vitaliy Satskyi (1930–2017), Ukrainian politician
 Polina Zhemchuzhina, Soviet politician and wife of Soviet foreign minister Vyacheslav Molotov

References

External links
 The murder of the Jews of Polohy during World War II, at Yad Vashem website.

Cities in Zaporizhzhia Oblast
Cities of district significance in Ukraine
Populated places established in the Russian Empire
Yekaterinoslav Governorate
Holocaust locations in Ukraine